Il Facchino (The Porter) is one of the talking statues of Rome. Like the other five "talking statues", pasquinades - irreverent satires poking fun at public figures - were posted beside Il Facchino in the 14th and 15th centuries.

Il Facchino was originally sited on the via del Corso, on the main facade of the Palazzo De Carolis Simonetti, near the piazza Venezia.  In 1874, it was moved to its current position, to the side of the same building, now the Banco di Roma, on the Via Lata.

Unlike the other talking statues, which are all dated to Ancient Rome, Il Facchino is relatively modern.  The statue was created in around 1580, to a design by Jacopo del Conte for the Corporazione degli Aquaroli .  It depicts a man wearing a cap and a sleeved shirt, carrying a barrel - an "acquarolo", who would take water from the Tiber to sell on the streets of Rome during the period before the Roman aqueducts were repaired at the orders of the Popes and the public fountains played again.  Somewhat incongruously, water spouts from the centre of the barrel, creating a fountain. The man's face is badly damaged, the result of paving stones thrown at it over the years, in the popular misapprehension because of the soft cap, that it portrayed Martin Luther.

See also

 The Scior Carera in Milan.

Bibliography
Rendina, C., "Pasquino statua parlante”, ROMA ieri, oggi, domani, n. 20 – febbraio 1990

References

External links
Roma Segreta: via del Corso: La fontana del Facchino 
The Insider's Guide to Rome, p.73
Chambers' Edinburgh Journal, p.106

Fountains in Rome
Talking statues of Rome
16th-century sculptures
Rome R. IX Pigna